Xhoffraix ([];  [Hofrê or Hyofrê ]) is a village of Wallonia in the municipality of Malmedy, district of Bévercé, located in the province of Liège, Belgium. 

Xhoffraix is located in the foothills of the High Fens region, along a national road connecting Malmedy to Signal de Botrange.

Notes

Malmedy
Populated places in Liège Province